Davis and White (Meryl Davis and Charlie White) are American former ice dancers. The pair are the 2014 Olympic Champion, the 2010 Olympic silver medalist, a two-time (2011, 2013) World champion, five-time Grand Prix Final champion (2009–2013), three-time Four Continents champion (2009, 2011, 2013) and six-time U.S. national champion (2009–2014). They also won a bronze medal in the team event at the 2014 Winter Olympics.

Davis and White teamed up in 1997. They are currently the longest-lasting dance team in the United States. They are the first American ice dancers to win the World title, as well as the first Americans to win the Olympic title. At the 2006 NHK Trophy, they became the first ice dancing team to receive level fours on all their elements.

Career

Early career
Davis began skating at age five on a local lake in the winter. She started out as a single skater, but began doing ice dance at age eight. She got as high as Midwestern sectionals in novice ladies before quitting singles to focus on ice dancing.

White began skating at the age of 5. As a singles skater, he won the bronze medal at the 2004 U.S. Championships on the Novice level, and competed internationally on the junior level. He quit skating singles following the 2005–06 season in order to focus on ice dancing. White began ice dancing when he was seven at his coach's advice, who hoped it would smooth out White's skating.

Davis and White were partnered together by Davis' coach, Seth Chafetz, in 1997.  In 2009, Davis said: "Charlie and I grew up 10 minutes apart from each other. Our parents are best friends. We've grown together and know each other so well."

Junior career
In their first season together, Davis/White won the silver medal at the Junior Olympics in the Juvenile division. In 1999–00, they won gold at the Junior Olympics on the intermediate level. In the 2000–01 season, they qualified for the 2001 U.S. Championships, placing 6th as Novices. In 2001–02, they won the silver medal as novices and then moved up to the junior level.  In the 2002–03 season, they did not win a medal at either of their two Junior Grand Prix assignments and placed 7th at the 2003 U.S. Championships in their junior debut.

In the 2003–2004 season, Davis/White won their sectional championship and then won the junior silver medal at Nationals. This earned them a trip to the 2004 Junior Worlds, where they placed 13th.

In the 2004–2005 season, Davis/White won two bronze medals on the ISU Junior Grand Prix series. However, White broke his ankle before Sectionals and so Davis/White were unable to qualify for the 2005 U.S. Championships. Their season ended there.

In the 2005–2006 season, Davis/White medaled at both their Junior Grand Prix events and placed second at the Junior Grand Prix Final. They won the junior national title at the 2006 U.S. Championships and then won the bronze medal at the 2006 Junior Worlds. Following that season, Davis aged out of Juniors. They lost some training time after White broke his ankle at a hockey tournament in 2006.

Senior career

2006–2007 season
In the 2006–07 season, Davis/White made their debut both nationally and internationally as seniors. They placed 4th at both their 2006–07 ISU Grand Prix assignments. At the 2006 NHK Trophy, they became the first team to earn all level fours on their elements. At the 2007 U.S. Championships, they won the bronze medal at the senior level, qualifying them for the 2007 World Championships. They are the first team since Tanith Belbin / Benjamin Agosto to go directly from winning the Junior national title to making the World team.

Davis/White also qualified for the Four Continents Championships, which took place before Worlds, and placed fourth. At the World Championships, Davis/White placed 7th, the highest debut placement for American ice dancers at Worlds since 1980.

2007–2008 season
Davis/White placed 4th at the 2007 Skate America and then went on to win their first Grand Prix medal at the 2007 Trophée Eric Bompard.

They completely revamped their Eleanor Rigby Eleanor's Dream free dance before the 2008 U.S. Championships due to its poor reception. They won the silver medal at the competition, one spot up from the previous season. They also won silver at 2008 Four Continents and were sixth at the 2008 World Championships.

2008–2009 season
In the 2008–2009 season, Davis/White won their first Grand Prix assignment, the 2008 Skate Canada. In their second assignment, the 2008 Cup of Russia, they placed third in the compulsory dance but were eighth in the original dance after White fell twice and stumbled on twizzles. They recovered in the free dance, placing second in the segment and moving up to win the bronze medal, which together with the gold from Skate Canada was enough to qualify them for their first Grand Prix Final. At the 2008–2009 Grand Prix Final, they won the bronze medal.

Davis/White won gold at the 2009 National Championships, after reigning champions Belbin/Agosto withdrew due to injury. They won by a 20-point margin over silver medalists Emily Samuelson / Evan Bates. In February 2009, they won the ice dance title at the Four Continents Championships, placing second in both the compulsory and original dance behind training mates Tessa Virtue / Scott Moir but winning the free dance. At the 2009 World Championships they placed 4th. Though they placed third in both the original and free dance portions, they lost too much ground in the compulsory to overcome training mates Virtue and Moir for the bronze. Only .04 points separated 3rd from 4th.

2009–2010 season
Davis/White competed at the 2009 Nebelhorn Trophy, finishing first in all the segments of the competition. Overall they won the gold medal with a score of 200.46 points, 30.87 ahead of silver medalists Alexandra Zaretsky / Roman Zaretsky.

Davis/White won the 2009 Rostelecom Cup and the 2009 NHK Trophy, which qualified them for the 2009–2010 Grand Prix Final. At the Grand Prix Final, they won the original dance and placed second in the free dance to win the title overall, becoming the first American ice dancers to do so. At the 2010 National Championships, Davis and White won their second national title. They beat former training partners Belbin/Agosto, the first time they had ever done so, and led through all portions of the competition.

At the 2010 Winter Olympics in Vancouver, British Columbia, Canada, Davis/White placed second to Canada's Virtue/Moir, winning silver. They skated a personal best in the free skate portion of ice dancing, garnering a score of 107.19 and received a personal best total score of 215.74. They also won the silver medal at the 2010 World Championships.

2010–2011 season
Davis/White were undefeated in their 2010–2011 season.

For the 2010–11 ISU Grand Prix season, they were assigned to the 2010 NHK Trophy and to the 2010 Skate America. They won NHK with 66.97 points in the short dance and 98.24 in the free dance, for a total of 165.21 points. Following NHK, they decided to make some adjustments to their free dance. At Skate America they earned 63.62 in the short dance and 93.06 points in the free dance after both fell, with their nearest rivals also having a fall. They earned an overall total of 156.68 and the gold medal. Their results qualified them for the 2010–2011 Grand Prix Final where they successfully defended their title, scoring 68.64 in the short and 102.94 in the free for a total of 171.58 points. They won their 3rd consecutive national title at the U.S. Championships held at Greensboro, North Carolina. They earned 76.04 points for their short dance and 109.44 points for their free dance scoring a total of 185.48 points.

At the 2011 Four Continents Championships, Davis/White placed second to Virtue/Moir in the short dance. The Canadians later withdrew from the free dance. Davis/White went on to win the free dance and the title with a total of 172.03 points. At the 2011 World Championships, they placed second in the short dance by 0.53 points, with a score of 73.76 points. In the free dance, they placed first with a score of 111.51 points, the highest free dance score that season. Overall, they won the gold medal with a score of 185.27, beating reigning Olympic and World champions Virtue/Moir by 3.48 points. This was the United States' first ice dancing World title.

2011–2012 season
For the 2011–2012 season, Davis/White were assigned to two Grand Prix events—2011 Skate America and 2011 Cup of Russia—having declined a newly introduced option to compete in a third. They announced their music selections in August, including La Strada for their free dance, but in October announced a change to Die Fledermaus. Davis and White won gold at Skate America, with 70.33 points in the short dance and 107.74 points in the free dance. They were 21.78 points ahead of 2nd place team Nathalie Péchalat / Fabian Bourzat. At 2011 Rostelecom Cup, the couple improved with a total score of 179.06, despite a small stumble in the short dance. They placed 17.88 points ahead of 2nd place team Kaitlyn Weaver / Andrew Poje. Their placements qualified them for the 2011–2012 Grand Prix Final, where they placed first. The two would later become silver medalists at the 2012 Four Continents Championships and 2012 World Championships. However, at the 2012 World Team Trophy, they edged Virtue/Moir by 5.6 points, and Team USA won the silver medal. Following Igor Shpilband's dismissal from the Arctic Edge Arena in June 2012, Davis/White decided to remain at the rink with Marina Zoueva and ended their collaboration with Shpilband.

2012–2013 season
For the 2012–2013 season, Davis/White were assigned to compete at 2012 Skate America and the 2012 NHK Trophy, winning gold in both events. In December, they set a record by becoming the first team to win four Grand Prix Final titles, when they came in first in both the short and free dances. In January 2013, they won their fifth consecutive National title, tying for the U.S. ice dance record. They set U.S. scoring records in both the short and free dances. They continued their undefeated season winning the gold medal at the 2013 Four Continents, despite a small bobble that left them in second in the short dance portion. They won the free dance ahead of Virtue/Moir. Then, at the World Championships in March, they again defeated Virtue/Moir to win their second world championship title, breaking their previous world records in both the short dance and combined total.

2013–2014 season
Davis and White worked with Derek Hough and Alex Wong on their programs for 2013 and 2014. 
On February 5, 2014, the pair appeared among five other Olympians in a one-hour special on NBC television, How to Raise an Olympian. During the team event at the 2014 Winter Olympics in Sochi, Davis and White earned 20 points in two first-place finishes for the U.S. team, which was awarded bronze medal overall. Davis and White posted record scores in both the short program and free dance and were awarded the first Olympic gold medal for Americans in ice dancing. They performed with Stars on Ice in 2014.

Post-competitive career
Davis and White continue to perform together in ice shows. In February 2017, they confirmed that they would not return to competition.

Programs

Post–2014

Pre–2014

Competitive highlights

Pre-2006 results

Detailed results
Small medals for short and free programs awarded only at ISU Championships — Worlds, Junior Worlds, and Four Continents.

Post-2006

 Personal bests highlighted in bold.

References

External links

Meryl Davis / Charlie White  at IceNetwork

Living people
Sports duos
Figure skaters at the 2010 Winter Olympics
Olympic silver medalists for the United States in figure skating
World Figure Skating Championships medalists
Four Continents Figure Skating Championships medalists
World Junior Figure Skating Championships medalists
Medalists at the 2010 Winter Olympics
Figure skaters at the 2014 Winter Olympics
Medalists at the 2014 Winter Olympics
Olympic bronze medalists for the United States in figure skating
Olympic gold medalists for the United States in figure skating
Season-end world number one figure skaters
Season's world number one figure skaters
Year of birth missing (living people)